Jaclyn Hales (born September 4, 1986) is an American actress best known for acting in BYUtv scripted series Extinct, The Sinister Surrogate (2018), Scents and Sensibility (2011), Unicorn City (2012), Christmas Eve (2015), Alienate (2016). and Cypher (2021).

Early life 
Hales was born in Syracuse, New York, after a while her family moved to Portsmouth, her first acting as a character was at a small theater in Alice in Wonderland as "Shrunken Alice" at the age of 6, when she became a teenager, her family moved to Utah where she became a film actress, first playing in The WB series Everwood.

Hales attended Utah Valley University for 4 years, graduated with a BS majoring in Theater Performance.

Filmography

Television

Film

References

External links 
 

1986 births
Living people
Actresses from Syracuse, New York
21st-century American actresses
American television actresses
American film actresses
Latter Day Saints from Utah
People from Los Angeles
American stage actresses
People from Portsmouth, New Hampshire
Utah Valley University alumni
Writers from Utah
Latter Day Saints from New York (state)
Latter Day Saints from New Hampshire
Latter Day Saints from California